Dr. Naqibullah Orya Khail (Pashto:داكترنقیب الله اوریا خیل, Persian:داكترنقیب الله اوریا خیل, born 1969) is an Afghan politician. He is the Leader of Hezb-e-Jawanan Musalman Afghanistan. He was elected leader on February 15, 2005. Usually referred to as Naqibullah Orya Khail, he previously served as a member of Hezbi Islami and served as an Assistant Commander of Mujahideen in Laghman Province during Soviet–Afghan War.

Early life
Naqib was born in 1969 in the Laghman Province of Afghanistan. He is an ethnic Pashtun of Orya Khail tribe. He completed his primary and secondary education at Hazrat Imam Hussain School in Peshawar. He attended National Council for Homeopathy in Islamabad. He completed his Master of Arts in Islmiat From Jamia Zia-ul-Madaris Peshawar.

Soviet–Afghan War
During the Soviet–Afghan War He served as an Assistant Commander in Laghman Province.

Personal life
Khail married May 21, 1990. He has four sons and three daughters. The family lived in Pakistan from 1980 as refugees.

Leadership of Hezbullah Afghanistan
He served as a member of Hezbi Islami in 1984. On February 15, 2005 Naqibullah and his followers established Hezb-e-Jawanan Musalman Afghanistan Political Party and Naqibullah was elected leader. He was jailed for 22 days in Laghman Province. Nine years later on March 21, 2014 the party changed its name to Hezbullah Afghanistan.

References

External links
 د حزب اهلل افغانستان مرامنامه
 ډاکټر نقیب الله اوریا خیل لنډ ژوندلیک:
 د ډاکټر نقیب الله اوریا خیل لنډ ژوندلیک:
 
 
 
 
 
 <

People from Laghman Province
Living people
1969 births